Gonzalo Pablo Noguera Delucchi (born May 16, 1977 in Montevideo, Uruguay) is an Uruguayan footballer currently playing for Miramar Misiones of the Segunda División in Uruguay.

Teams
  Montevideo Wanderers 1995–2001
  Deportes La Serena 2001–2002
  Miramar Misiones 2003–2007
  Progreso 2007–2008
  Peñarol 2008–2010
  Deportivo Maldonado 2010
  Miramar Misiones 2011–present

References
 
 
 Profile at Tenfield Digital 

1977 births
Living people
Uruguayan footballers
Uruguayan expatriate footballers
C.A. Progreso players
Peñarol players
Miramar Misiones players
Deportivo Maldonado players
Montevideo Wanderers F.C. players
Deportes La Serena footballers
Primera B de Chile players
Expatriate footballers in Chile
Association football goalkeepers